King Without a Crown may refer to:

"King Without a Crown" (Matisyahu song), 2005
"King Without a Crown" (ABC song), 1987